Necitumumab (INN) is a recombinant human IgG1 monoclonal antibody used as an antineoplastic, which is manufactured by Eli Lilly. It binds to the epidermal growth factor receptor (EGFR). The US FDA approved necitumumab under the brand name Portrazza for use with gemcitabine  and cisplatin  in previously untreated metastatic squamous non-small-cell lung carcinoma (NSCLC). It was counterproductive in non-squamous non-small-cell lung carcinoma.

References

Monoclonal antibodies for tumors
Eli Lilly and Company brands